Bent Salvesen (born 20 October 1787 at Hesnes in Grimstad, died 17 September 1820 in Santander, Spain) was a Norwegian ship's captain, lieutenant in the Royal Danish Navy and privateer authorized by the Dano-Norwegian government to attack English ships during the Napoleonic Wars. He commanded one of the two ships from Drammen which received the letter of marque during the Napoleonic Wars.

He was a son of ship's captain and ship-owner Salve Olsen Hesnes (1749–1813) and Louise Bentsdatter (1760–1814), and his ancestors on both sides had been ship's captains from today's Grimstad and Arendal for generations. He was also descended from the estate owner Henrik Jacobsen Friis of Molland (died 1665) and the Ahlefeldt and Gyldenstierne families. He was named for his maternal grandfather, ship's captain Bent Pedersen Kolbjørnsviken (1724–1781) from Kolbjørnsvik. He was married to Goron Cathrine Fegth (1785–1838), a daughter of the Drammen timber merchant Jacob Fegth. After serving as a lieutenant in the Navy from 1807, he became a burgher in Strømsø on 19 September 1810 and sailed as a captain of his father-in-law's ships. Aged 26, he received letter of marque on 10 November 1813 for his ship Recovery (owned by Niels and Gabriel Omsted) with 14 cannons and a crew of 30 men. The ship was taken over by the Navy in 1814.

In 1817, he left his wife and seven children, and went on a long voyage to the East Indies as an officer of a Danish ship. He did not return, and died in 1820 in the Spanish port town Santander, aged 33. He had been employed as captain of a Danish ship bound for Spain in Copenhagen in 1820, after returning from the East Indies.

On 18 September 1818, his wife petitioned the King for burghership of Strømsø in her own right to be able to support herself and her children. Parish priest of Skoger and Tangen, Andreas Jacob Lund, wrote in a recommendation of the application on 25 September 1818 that his wife, "Goran Cathrine Salvesen has always distinguished herself by her diligence and concern for her children's upbringing. A rare and totally inexcusable indifference to her, his children and his household, on the other hand, has always characterised her husband, Captain Bent Salvesen. Based on his behaviour in his absence, she has no reason to hope for any contribution to her or her children's subsistence. She therefore must provide for her family herself." The application was finally granted on 14 December 1823, after being recommended by many of Strømsø's leading men and by governor Johan Collett.

According to Alfthan Vogt Brocklesby Juel, Bent Salvesen was well known in Drammen for his witty humour, giving rise to several sayings in Norway.

He was the father of, among others, Jacob Fegth Salvesen (born 1809), who settled in Africa and married an English woman, of ship's merchant in Antwerp Iver Feght Salvesen (born 1817), and of Caroline Louise Salvesen (1812–1887), who grew up with her uncle, ship-owner and estate owner Anders Juel, and who married ship-owner Nicolai Nissen Paus (1811–1877). Bent Salvesen has descendants with names including Salvesen, Paus, Høeg, Kapteijn, Løvenskiold, Wessel, and other names.

References

Norwegian sailors
Royal Dano-Norwegian Navy personnel
Privateers
Norwegian military personnel of the Napoleonic Wars
People from Grimstad
People from Drammen
1787 births
1820 deaths